Danny Jacobs is an American actor and comedian who made his voice acting debut in 1999 with an uncredited role in Full Blast. He began his role of King Julien (originally voiced by Sacha Baron Cohen) in The Penguins of Madagascar (2008–2015) and had reprised his role in the Christmas special Merry Madagascar (2009), the Valentine's Day short Madly Madagascar (2013) and All Hail King Julien (2014–2017). He also impersonated  Cohen's character Borat Sagdiyev (as well as a cameo appearance as a Pirate with an Eye Patch) in Epic Movie (2007).

Besides King Julien, his voice work includes the role of Rowdy Remington in Kick Buttowski: Suburban Daredevil (2010–2012), Victor Zsasz in Batman: Arkham Asylum (2009) and Batman: Arkham City (2011), Special Agent Porter in Justice League: Doom (2012), Snake / Snakeweed in Teenage Mutant Ninja Turtles (2012), Grifter / Captain Cold in Justice League: The Flashpoint Paradox (2013), Baron Mordo in Ultimate Spider-Man vs. The Sinister 6 (2016) and Heinrich Zemo in Avengers: Ultron Revolution (2016).

Career
In 1993, Jacobs originated the role of Chico Fernández in Jeff Daniels' comedy The Vast Difference at the Purple Rose Theatre.

In 1996–97, he won acting awards in Michigan, Florida and Wisconsin for his portrayal of Aram in Richard Kalinoski's "Beast on the Moon."

In 1999, Jacobs landed an uncredited voice role as Curt in Full Blast. In the same year, he appeared in his first live-action role in Get the Hell Out of Hamtown.

In 2003, he began to tour the nation with "Triple Espresso: A Highly Caffeinated Comedy."

Jacobs portrayed Borat Sagdiyev and made a cameo appearance as a Pirate with an Eye Patch in Epic Movie (2007). When portraying the role of Borat, Jacobs did an impression of Sacha Baron Cohen.

In 2008–2015, Jacobs was a substitute for Baron Cohen as the voice of King Julien in The Penguins of Madagascar, again as an impression of Baron Cohen (Jacobs also provided additional voices in the series). In 2011, he won a Daytime Emmy Award for the role. Jacobs reprised his role in Merry Madagascar (2009) and Madly Madagascar (2013). In 2014–2017, he returned to the role in All Hail King Julien. In Penguins of Madagascar (2014), Jacobs once again reprised his role as King Julien. He had also done voice-overs in various commercials.

In addition to the jobs that led to All Hail King Julien, Jacobs had been doing voice-over work for animated television series, including Phineas and Ferb (in which he provided additional voices) and Teenage Mutant Ninja Turtles (in which he voiced Snake / Snakeweed), as well as several video games. He had said that animation, much like the theatre, gives actors a chance to play a wide range of roles. He said, "I can play any character of any ethnicity, any age, even any gender. And that's a freedom the camera doesn't give you. It's an incredibly freeing thing." He also stated that King Julien is his favorite voice role and would gladly reprise his role if ever asked. Jacobs had received more recognition as King Julien than the character's predecessor Baron Cohen. In Madagascar 3: Europe's Most Wanted (2012), Jacobs provided the singing voice of King Julien for the soundtrack.

He had a voice role in Teen Titans Go! as George Washington.

Personal life
Jacobs is a devout Catholic of Lebanese descent. On July 13, 2015, Jacobs donated to Kids Kicking Cancer and had entertained some children with his King Julien voice.

Awards and nominations
Jacobs was nominated for the 2010 Annie Award for Voice Acting in a Television Production for his voice role of King Julien in Merry Madagascar (2009), but lost the award to Tom Kenny.

He won a 2011 Daytime Emmy Award and 2015 Daytime Emmy Award for his voice role of King Julien in The Penguins of Madagascar (2008–2015) and All Hail King Julien (2014–2017).

 2010: Annie Award for Voice Acting in a Television Production – Nominated
 2011: Daytime Emmy Award for Outstanding Performer in an Animated Program – Won
 2015: Daytime Emmy Award for Outstanding Performer in an Animated Program – Won

Filmography

Film
 Full Blast as Curt (voice) (uncredited) (1999)
 Get the Hell Out of Hamtown (1999)
 Grounds Zero as Omar (2006)
 The Mikes as Paramedic (2006)
 Epic Movie as Borat Sagdiyev / Pirate with Eye Patch (2007)
 Madagascar: Escape 2 Africa as Tourist with New York T-shirt (voice) (2008)
 Batman: Year One as Arnold John Flass' Attorney (voice) (2011)
 Justice League: Doom as Special Agent Porter (voice) (2012)
 Madagascar 3: Europe's Most Wanted as King Julien XIII (singing voice in soundtrack only) / Croupier / Circus Master (voice) (2012)
 Justice League: The Flashpoint Paradox as Grifter / Captain Cold (2013)
 Penguins of Madagascar as King Julien XIII (voice) (2014)

Television
 Olive, the Other Reindeer (voice) (1999)
 Futurama as Additional Voices (voice) (uncredited) (1999)
 Mad Men as Yoram Ben Shulhai (1 episode) (2007)
 The Penguins of Madagascar as King Julien XIII / Roy / Hornets / Additional Voices (2008–2015)
 Phineas and Ferb as Additional Voices (voice) (2009–2013)
 Merry Madagascar as King Julien XIII (voice) (2009)
 Kick Buttowski: Suburban Daredevil as Rowdy Remington (voice) (2010–2012)
 Ben 10: Ultimate Alien as Captain / Police Dispatch / Dr. Pervis (voice) (2012)
 Teenage Mutant Ninja Turtles as Snake / Snakeweed (voice) (2012)
 Madly Madagascar as King Julien XIII (voice) (2013)
 Teen Titans Go! as George Washington (voice) (2014)
 All Hail King Julien as King Julien XIII / Pancho (voice) (2014–2017)
 Miles from Tomorrowland as Admiral Watson / Additional Voices (voice) (2015)
 Pig Goat Banana Cricket as Barbershop Quartet / Cuddles, Jr. / Lasagna / Townperson #2 (voice) (2015)
 Ultimate Spider-Man vs. The Sinister 6 as Baron Mordo / Additional Voices (voice) (2016)
 Lego Star Wars: The Freemaker Adventures as Raam / Yeppau (voice) (2016)
 Avengers: Ultron Revolution as Heinrich Zemo (voice) (2016)
 Transformers: Robots in Disguise as Brother Gunter (voice) (2016)
Apple & Onion as Hoagie (voice) (2018)
Blood of Zeus as King Periander / King Acrisius (voice) (2020)
Animaniacs as Starbox (voice) (2020)

Video games
 Madagascar: Escape 2 Africa as King Julien XIII (voice) (2008)
 Batman: Arkham Asylum as Victor Zsasz / Frank Boles / Masked Guard #1 / Robert Sterling (voice) (2009)
 Madagascar Kartz as King Julien XIII (voice) (2009)
 The Godfather 2 as Hyman Roth (voice) (2009)
 White Knight Chronicles as additional voices (voice) (2010)
 White Knight Chronicles 2 as Nanazel (voice) (2010)
 Marvel Super Hero Squad: The Infinity Gauntlet as Annihilus Bugs (voice) (2010)
 The Penguins of Madagascar: Dr. Blowhole Returns – Again! as King Julien XIII (voice) (2011)
 Batman: Arkham City as Victor Zsasz (voice) (2011)
 Madagascar 3: The Video Game as King Julien and Stefano (voice) (2012)
 Skylanders series as Swarm and additional Voices (voice) (2015)
 Avengers as Hank Pym (2020)

Discography
 "Gonna Make You Sweat (Everybody Dance Now)," performing as King Julien XIII's singing voice (2012)
 "Wannabe," performing as King Julien XIII's singing voice (2012)
 "Hot in Herre", performing as King Julien XIII's singing voice (2012)
 "Afro Circus / I Like to Move It," performing as King Julien XIII's singing voice, along with Marty (Chris Rock) (2012)
 All songs featured here are attributed to the soundtrack of Madagascar 3: Europe's Most Wanted

References

External links
 
 
 

Living people
American male film actors
American male television actors
American male video game actors
American male voice actors
Daytime Emmy Award winners
Place of birth missing (living people)
Year of birth missing (living people)
21st-century American male actors
American people of Lebanese descent
American Catholics
Middle Eastern Christians